Lefkaritika or Lefkara Lace is a handmade lace from Pano Lefkara Cyprus. Notable characteristics are the hemstitch, satin stitch fillings, needlepoint edgings, white, brown, ecru colours and geometric intricate patterns. in 2009, this traditional craft of lace-making was inscribed on the Representative List of the Intangible Cultural Heritage.

History 

Lefkaritika is the characteric type of embroidery art in Cyprus, dating back to at least the fourteenth century. It falls under the category of white embroidery art of Cyprus. It is the evolution of an older type, called "asproploumia". The main stitches of "asproploumia" survived in the newest type of Lefkaritika. New stitches and motifs are added depending on the skill and creativity of the embroideress. Lefkaritika soon reached a higher level of quality, because of the competition between women, since they were considered to be a center piece of a dowry. Each girl had to have an extended collection ready for exhibition on her wedding day. This way a lot of the traditional elements were passed from mother to daughter. Many women practiced embroidery as a profession as well. Women embroideresses in Pano Lefkara, called "ploumarisses" organised their production from home. Men from Lefkara, called "kentitarides", were merchants and they traveled across Europe and Scandinavia. According to tradition, in 15th century Leonardo da Vinci visited Cyprus and took a Lefkara Lace back to Italy with him, which today decorates Duomo Cathedral in Milan.

Centers of production 
The greatest centers of production used to be Pano Lefkara and Kato Lefkara villages. Today these embroideries are manufactured all over Cyprus, especially in villages, Kato Drys, Vavla, Vavatsinia, Ora, Choirokoitia, Skarinou, Dali and Athienou.

Materials and technique 
The first Lefkara Lace was made from the local white cotton fabric produced in Cyprus. A combination of stitches and cuts is used. The large embroideries called "tagiades" are added to "dantela venis" ("Venice Lace"), "pittota", "gyroulota", "liminota" patterns. Their name comes from the Italian "Punto Tagliato", a kind of a cut design popular in Italy during the 16th century, According to the Cyprus Handicraft Service the different motifs for Lefkara Lace add to more than 650.

The most characteristic pattern in Lefkara Lace is "potamoi" ("rivers"). They made from triangular zig-zags, called "kamares" ("arcs").

References

Lace
Textile arts of Cyprus
Intangible Cultural Heritage of Humanity